Bycatch (or by-catch), in the fishing industry, is a fish or other marine species that is caught unintentionally while fishing for specific species or sizes of wildlife. Bycatch is either the wrong species, the wrong sex, or is undersized or juveniles of the target species. The term "bycatch" is also sometimes used for untargeted catch in other forms of animal harvesting or collecting. Non-marine species (freshwater fish not saltwater fish) that are caught (either intentionally or unintentionally) but regarded as generally "undesirable" are referred to as "rough fish" (mainly US) and "coarse fish" (mainly UK).

In 1997, the Organisation for Economic Co-operation and Development (OECD) defined bycatch as "total fishing mortality, excluding that accounted directly by the retained catch of target species". Bycatch contributes to fishery decline and is a mechanism of overfishing for unintentional catch.

The average annual bycatch rate of pinnipeds and cetaceans in the US from 1990 to 1999 was estimated at 6215 animals with a standard error of 448.

Bycatch issues originated with the "mortality of dolphins in tuna nets in the 1960s".

There are at least four different ways the word "bycatch" is used in fisheries:
 Catch which is retained and sold but which is not the target species for the fishery
 Species/sizes/sexes of fish which fishers discard
 Non-target fish, whether retained and sold or discarded
 Unwanted invertebrate species, such as echinoderms and non-commercial crustaceans, and various vulnerable species groups, including seabirds, sea turtles, marine mammals and elasmobranchs (sharks and their relatives).

Additionally, the term "deliberate bycatch" is used to refer to bycatch as a source of illegal wildlife trade (IWT) in several areas throughout world.

There are several tools to estimate bycatch limits--the maximum number of animals that could be sustainably removed from a population impacted by bycatch.
These include the 'potential biological removal' (PBR) and the 'sustainable anthropogenic mortality in stochastic environments' (SAMSE), which incorporates stochastic factors to determine sustainable limits to bycatch and other human-caused mortality of wildlife.

Examples

Recreational fishing
Given the popularity of recreational fishing throughout the world, a small local study in the US in 2013 suggested that discards may be an important unmonitored source of fish mortality.

Shrimp trawling
 

The highest rates of incidental catch of non-target species are associated with tropical shrimp trawling. In 1997, the Food and Agriculture Organization of the United Nations (FAO) documented the estimated bycatch and discard levels from shrimp fisheries around the world. They found discard rates (bycatch to catch ratios) as high as 20:1 with a world average of 5.7:1.

Shrimp trawl fisheries catch two percent of the world total catch of all fish by weight, but produce more than one-third of the world total bycatch. US shrimp trawlers produce bycatch ratios between 3:1 (3 bycatch:1 shrimp) and 15:1 (15 bycatch:1 shrimp).

Trawl nets in general, and shrimp trawls in particular, have been identified as sources of mortality for cetacean and finfish species. When bycatch is discarded (returned to the sea), it is often dead or dying.

Tropical shrimp trawlers often make trips of several months without coming to port. A typical haul may last four hours after which the net is pulled in. Just before it is pulled on board the net is washed by zigzagging at full speed. The contents are then dumped on deck and are sorted. An average of 5.7:1 means that for every kilogram of shrimp there are 5.7 kg of bycatch. In tropical inshore waters the bycatch usually consists of small fish. The shrimps are frozen and stored onboard; the bycatch is discarded.

Recent sampling in the South Atlantic rock shrimp fishery found 166 species of finfish, 37 crustacean species, and 29 other species of invertebrate among the bycatch in the trawls. Another sampling of the same fishery over a two-year period found that rock shrimp amounted to only 10% of total catch weight. Iridescent swimming crab, dusky flounder, inshore lizardfish, spot, brown shrimp, longspine swimming crabs, and other bycatch made up the rest.

Despite the use of bycatch reduction devices, the shrimp fishery in the Gulf of Mexico removes about 25–45 million red snapper annually as bycatch, nearly one-half the amount taken in recreational and commercial snapper fisheries.

Cetacean

Cetaceans, such as dolphins, porpoises, and whales, can be seriously affected by entanglement in fishing nets and lines, or direct capture by hooks or in trawl nets. Cetacean bycatch is increasing in intensity and frequency. In some fisheries, cetaceans are captured as bycatch but then retained because of their value as food or bait. In this fashion, cetaceans can become a target of fisheries.

One example of bycatch is dolphins caught in tuna nets. As dolphins are mammals and do not have gills, they may drown while stuck in nets underwater. This bycatch issue has been one of the reasons of the growing ecolabelling industry, where fish producers mark their packagings with disclaimers such as "dolphin friendly" to reassure buyers. However, "dolphin friendly" does not mean that dolphins were not killed in the production of a particular tin of tuna, but that the fleet which caught the tuna did not specifically target a feeding pod of dolphins, but relied on other methods to spot tuna schools.
The bycatch of the Caspian seal may be recognized as the one of the biggest entanglements of pinnipeds as bycatch in the world

Albatross

Of the 22 albatross species recognised by IUCN on their Red List, 15 are threatened with extinction, six species are considered as Near Threatened, and only one of Least Concern. Two species, the Tristan albatross and the waved albatross, are considered as Critically Endangered. One of the main threats is commercial longline fishing, because albatrosses and other seabirds which readily feed on offal are attracted to the set bait, after which they become hooked on the lines and drown. An estimated 100,000 albatross per year are killed in this fashion. Unregulated pirate fisheries exacerbate the problem.

A research study examined the impact of illegal longline fishing vessels on albatrosses, by using environmental criminology as a guiding theoretical framework. The results indicated that potentially illegal longline fishing activities are highly concentrated in areas of illegally-caught fish species, and the risk to bycatch albatrosses is significantly higher in areas where these illegal longline fishing vessels operate. These findings provide strong grounding that illegal longline fishing poses a particularly serious threat to the survival of seabirds.

Sea turtles

Sea turtles, already critically endangered, have been killed in large numbers in shrimp trawl nets. Estimates indicate that thousands of Kemp's ridley, loggerhead, green, and leatherback sea turtles are caught in shrimp trawl fisheries in the Gulf of Mexico and the US Atlantic annually The speed and length of the trawl method is significant because, "for a tow duration of less than 10 minutes, the mortality rate for sea turtles is less than one percent, whereas for tows greater than sixty minutes the mortality rate rapidly increases to fifty to one hundred percent".

Sea turtles can sometimes escape from the trawls. In the Gulf of Mexico, the Kemp’s ridley turtles recorded most interactions, followed in order by loggerhead, green, and leatherback sea turtles. In the US Atlantic, the interactions were greatest for loggerheads, followed in order by Kemp’s ridley, leatherback, and green sea turtles.

Fishing gear
Bycatch is inevitable wherever there is fishing. The incidental catch is not limited to only fish species: dolphins, sea turtles, and seabirds are also victims of bycatch. Longlines, trawls and purse seine nets are driving factors in the endangerment of no fewer than fifteen shark species. Bycatch may also affect reproduction of populations as juveniles are also victims of bycatch. Bycatch happens most commonly with the use of gillnetting, longlines, or bottom trawling. Longlines with bait hook attachments can potentially reach lengths of dozens of kilometres, and, along with gill nets in the water and bottom trawls sweeping the sea floor, can catch essentially everything in their path. There are thousands of kilometres of nets and lines cast into the world's oceans daily. This modern fish gear is robust and invisible to the eye, making it efficient at catching fish and bycatching everything that happens to be in the way. Hook-and-line fishing could limit bycatch to a certain extent as the non-target animals can be released back to the ocean fairly quickly.

Mitigation

Concern about bycatch has led fishers and scientists to seek ways of reducing unwanted catch. There are two main approaches.

One approach is to ban fishing in areas where bycatch is unacceptably high. Such area closures can be permanent, seasonal, or for a specific period when a bycatch problem is registered. Temporary area closures are common in some bottom trawl fisheries where undersized fish or non-target species are caught unpredictably. In some cases fishers are required to relocate when a bycatch problem occurs.

The other approach is alternative fishing gear. A technically simple solution is to use nets with a larger mesh size, allowing smaller species and smaller individuals to escape. However, this usually requires replacing the existing gear. In some cases, it is possible to modify gear. Bycatch reduction devices (BRDs) and the Nordmore grate are net modifications that help fish escape from shrimp nets.

Bycatch reduction devices
BRDs allow many commercial finfish species to escape. The US government has approved BRDs that reduce finfish bycatch by 30%. Spanish mackerel and weakfish bycatch in the South Atlantic was reduced by 40%. However, recent surveys suggest BRDs may be less effective than previously thought. A rock shrimp fishery off Florida found the devices did not exclude 166 species of fish, 37 crustacean species, and 29 species of other invertebrates.

A pulsed electric field-based shark and ray bycatch mitigation device, SharkGuard, was reported by 2022 study to have reduced bycatch of blue shark by 91% and of stingrays by 71% with commercial fishing gear in a French longline tuna fishery in the Mediterranean.

Turtle excluder devices
In 1978, the National Marine Fisheries Service (NMFS) started to develop turtle excluder devices (TED). A TED uses a grid which deflects turtles and other big animals, so they exit from the trawl net through an opening above the grid. US shrimp trawlers and foreign fleets which market shrimp in the US are required to use TEDs. Not all nations enforce the use of TEDs.

For the most part, when they are used, TEDs have been successful reducing sea turtle bycatch. However, they are not completely effective, and some turtles are still captured. NMFS certifies TED designs if they are 97% effective. In heavily trawled areas, the same sea turtle may pass repeatedly through TEDs. Recent studies indicate recapture rates of 20% or more, but it is not clear how many turtles survive the escape process.

Conservation engineering of trawl nets
The size selectivity of trawl nets is controlled by the size of the net openings, especially in the "cod end". The larger the openings, the more easily small fish can escape. The development and testing of modifications to fishing gear to improve selectivity and decrease impact is called "conservation engineering".

Longline fishing is controversial in some areas because of bycatch. Mitigation methods have been successfully implemented in some fisheries. These include:
 weights to sink the lines quickly
 streamer lines to scare birds away from baited hooks while deploying the lines
 setting lines only at night with minimal ship lighting (to avoid attracting birds)
 limiting fishing seasons to the southern winter (when most seabirds are not feeding young)
 not discharging offal while setting lines.

However, gear modifications do not eliminate bycatch of many species. In March 2006, the Hawaii longline swordfish fishing season was closed due to excessive loggerhead sea turtle bycatch after being open only a few months, despite using modified circle hooks.

No discards policy
One solution that Norway came up with to reduce bycatch is to, "adopt a 'no discards' policy". This means that the fishermen must keep everything they catch. This policy has helped to "encourage bycatch research", which, in turn has helped "encourage behavioral changes in fishers" and "reduce the waste of life" as well.

Seabirds
Seabirds get entangled in longlines by flocking around vessels, this eventually leads to drowning because they try to catch baits on the hooks. Fisheries had been using "streamer lines" as a cost effective solution to mitigate this type of bycatch, and it has dramatically reduced seabird mortality. These streamer lines have bright colors and are made of polyester rope, they are positioned alongside the longlines on both sides. Their bright colors and constantly flapping of water frightens the seabirds and they fly away before reaching the baited hooks. A successful example would be the use of streamer lines in Alaskan groundfish longline fisheries, as the deaths of seabirds declined by about 70% after the employment of these lines.

Alternative to discarding
Some fisheries retain bycatch, rather than throwing the fish back into the ocean. Sometimes bycatch is sorted and sold as food, especially in Asia, Africa and Latin America, where cost of labour is cheaper. Bycatch can also be sold in frozen bags as "assorted seafood" or "seafood medley" at cheaper prices. Bycatch can be converted into fish hydrolysate (ground up fish carcasses) for use as a soil amendment in organic agriculture or it can be used as an ingredient in fish meal. In Southeast Asia bycatch is sometimes used as a raw material for fish sauce production. Bycatch is also commonly de-boned, de-shelled, ground and blended into fish paste or moulded into fish cakes (surimi) and sold either fresh (for domestic use) or frozen (for export). This is commonly the case in Asia or by Asian fisheries. Sometimes bycatch is sold to fish farms to feed farmed fish, especially in Asia.

Non-fisheries bycatch
The term "bycatch" is used also in contexts other than fisheries. Examples are insect collecting with pitfall traps or flight interception traps for either financial, controlling or scientific purposes (where the bycatch may either be small vertebrates or untargeted insects) and control of introduced vertebrates which have become pest species like the muskrat in Europe (where the bycatch in traps may be European minks or waterfowl).

See also 

 Environmental stewardship
 Discards
 Cetacean bycatch
 List of environmental issues
 Shrimp turtle case
 Ghost net

References

Further reading

 FAO (2009) Technical Guidelines for Responsible Fisheries, Number 1: Fishing operations, supplement 2 Best practices to reduce incidental catch of seabirds in capture fisheries Rome. .
 FAO (1997) A STUDY OF THE OPTIONS FOR UTILIZATION OF BYCATCH AND DISCARDS FROM MARINE CAPTURE FISHERIES A STUDY OF THE OPTIONS FOR UTILIZATION...
 Karp WA, Desfosse LL and Brooke SG (2011) U.S. National Bycatch Report  National Marine Fisheries Service, NOAA Technical Memo NMFS-F/SPO-117E.
 SAFMC (1998) Final Habitat Plan for the South Atlantic Region Essential Fish Habitat Requirements for Fishery. Management Plans of the South Atlantic Fishery Management Council. The Shrimp Fishery Management Plan (FMP), the Red Drum FMP, the Snapper Grouper FMP, the Coastal Migratory Pelagics FMP, the Golden Crab FMP, the Spiny Lobster FMP, the Coral, Coral Reefs, and Live/Hard Bottom Habitat FMP, the Sargassum Habitat FMP, and the Calico Scallop FMP.
 U.S. Shrimp (South Atlantic and Gulf of Mexico) – Blue Ocean Institute. Retrieved 22 March 2008.

External links
Mitigating Adverse Ecological impacts of open oceanfisheries – European project MADE (28 minute film)
Bycatch – Smithsonian Ocean Portal
Bycatch Management Information System – mitigation techniques, species ID & safe handling, regulations, curated literature
Lenfest Ocean Program publication on regional governance of bycatch in tuna fisheries
Project GLOBAL: Global Bycatch Assessment of Long-Lived Species project
Oceana facts about bycatch/dirty fishing
FAO document on bycatch and discard
Greenpeace facts about bycatch
Alaska Marine Conservation Council
 Johnson, Douglas H; Shaffer, Terry L and Gould, Patrick J (1990) Incidental Catch of Marine Birds in the North Pacific High Seas Driftnet Fisheries U.S. Geological Survey.
 Valdemarsen, John W Incidental catch of seabirds in longline fisheries UN Atlas of the Oceans: Fishery Technology Service.

Environmental impact of fishing
Bird mortality